Seán Keane (14 September 1899 – 29 March 1953) was an Irish Labour Party politician and publican. He was elected to Dáil Éireann as a Labour Party Teachta Dála (TD) for the Cork East constituency at the 1948 general election and was re-elected at the 1951 general election. 

He died in office in 1953 and the by-election caused by his death was won by Richard Barry of Fine Gael.

References

1899 births
1953 deaths
Labour Party (Ireland) TDs
Members of the 13th Dáil
Members of the 14th Dáil
Politicians from County Cork